The Narma are a tribe found in Bagh District of Azad Kashmir, Pakistan.

References

Social groups of Azad Kashmir